Trapped Within the Words is an EP by the Norwegian band Ancestral Legacy, released on  April 10, 2008.

Track listing
 "Forsaken" - 7:06
 "Wordless History" - 6:28
 "Atrapada En Pesadillas" - 2:50
 "Disclosed" - 5:26
 "Glimmer" - 6:45

Personnel

Ancestral Legacy 
Elin Anita Omholt - Vocals (female)
Eddie Risdal - Guitars, Vocals (harsh), Synthetizers
Christopher Midtsvéen Vigre - Drums
Tor Arvid Larsen - Guitars

Guest/session musicians 
Isadora Cortina - Vocals (female) (track 3)
Knut Magne Valle - Effects (additional) (track 2)

Production and engineering 
Eddie Risdal - Layout, Songwriting
Knut Magne Valle - Mixing, Mastering
Cato Pedersen - Photography (band)
Marcela Bolívar - Cover art

External links 
Discogs.com
Metallum Archives

2008 albums
Ancestral Legacy EPs